Sabar Mirza Farman Farmaian (1912–2006) was an Iranian doctor, researcher, and he was of Qajar nobility. He served as the Director of the Pasteur Institute of Iran and served as the Iran Minister of Health (1952–1953). He was the first son of Persian Qajar prince and nobleman Abdol Hossein Mirza Farmanfarma, through Masoumeh Khanoum.

Biography 
He was born in 1912 in Mashhad, Iran, to parents Massoumeh Khanum Tafreshi (1899–1978) and Abdol Hossein Mirza Farmanfarma. At the age of 12, he was sent to France to continue his studies. He studied medicine in France and Switzerland, eventually earning him a degree from University of Geneva in 1983.

He quickly decided on medicine, specializing in malaria and studying it to great extent. Sabar Farmanfarmaian participated in a number of projects initiated by the World Health Organization.

He was a staunch supporter of Mossadegh during Iran's oil nationalization in 1953. He held the post of Minister of Health, during Mossadegh's second cabinet, holding office from 21 July 1952 – 19 August 1953.

He died on 19 May 2006 and is buried in Behesht-e Zahra Cemetery in Tehran. He never married.

See also
 History of Iran
 Qajar dynasty of Iran

References

Sources 
Daughter of Persia; Sattareh Farman Farmaian with Dona Munker; Crown Publishers,Inc.,New York,1992
 Blood and Oil: Memoirs of a Persian Prince; Manucher Mirza Farman Farmaian. Random House, New York, 1997.

External links

Qajar princes
1912 births
2006 deaths
Farmanfarmaian family